Mokino is the name of several rural localities in Russia:
Mokino, Nytvensky District, Perm Krai, a village in Nytvensky District, Perm Krai
Mokino, Permsky District, Perm Krai, a village in Permsky District, Perm Krai